Indianisation also known as Indianization, may refer to the spread of Indian languages, culture, diaspora, cuisines, economic reach and impact since India is one of the greatest influencers since ancient times and the current century has been called the Indian Century.

Indian culture
Historical spread of Indian culture beyond India proper:

 Indomania or Indophilia refers to the special interest that Indian culture has generated in the world, more specifically the western world.
 Greater India
 Indosphere
 Sanskritisation
 institutions with Sanskrit mottos
 Indianization of Southeast Asia
 Indianized kingdom
 History of Indian influence on Southeast Asia
 South-East Asia campaign of Rajendra Chola I
 Chola invasion of Srivijaya 
 Indian influences in early Philippine polities
 East Indies or Indies in Southeast Asia under Indian cultural influence, e.g. Indonesia and Philippines 
 Indochina, Indianized Southeast Asia under French colonial rule

Indian soft power 

Global spread of Indian soft power: 

 Medical tourism in India
 Ayurveda
 Siddha medicine
 Yoga

 India - one of the major ancient great powers
 Global influence of Indian architecture
 Global influence of Indian cuisine
 Historical influence of Indian cuisine on Southeast Asian cuisine 
 Global Influence of Indian martial arts, especially on Southeast Asian martial arts
 Global influence of Indian movies and Bollywood
 Global influence of Indian music
 Global influence of India in names of people
 Global influence of India in names of places
 India at the Big Four international beauty pageants

 Influence of Indian honorifics in Southeast Asia
 Filipino 
 Indonesian
 Malay
 Thai

 Educational institutions across the world with Sanskrit mottos
 Non-educational institutions across the world with Sanskrit mottos
 Indianisation of British Colonial India's bureaucracy
 Renaming of cities in India

Indian economic impact on the world
Impact of Economy of India on world economy as well as globalisation:

 Current GDP (PPP), India is ranked on 3rd  place
 Current Nominal GDP, India is ranked on 5th place
 Current GDP growth rate, India is ranked among top 7

 Current top recipient of remittance, India is ranked on 1st place for last several years
 Remittances to India 
 Foreign-exchange reserves of India

 Production in India, one of the top producer and consumer country 
 Among top 2 largest producer of most mineral, metals, and fuel types
 Among top 3 largest producer of fisheries harvest
 Among top 5 largest producer of most agricultural and dairy commodities

 Foreign trade of India
 Exports of India
 Business process outsourcing to India 
 H-1B visa, over 80% of all these visas are granted to Indians IT professionals 
 Indian origin CEOs of top global multinational companies
 Largest trading partners of India
 Pharmaceutical industry in India

Indian diaspora
Global Indian diaspora is world's largest diaspora, which includes NRIs, OCI, PIO, and mixed races:

 Indian diaspora (PIO and NRI), world's largest diaspora 
 Overseas Citizenship of India
 List of heads of state and government of Indian origin, Indian diaspora's influence on policy making of other nations
 List of foreign politicians of Indian origin, Indian diaspora's influence on policy making of other nations

 British colonial era diaspora
 Coolies and Girmityas, such as Indian South Africans, Malaysian Indians, Indo-Caribbeans, Indo-Fijians, Mauritians of Indian origin, Indian diaspora in Southeast Africa, Indian Singaporeans
 Anglo-Indians, such as Eurasians in Singapore, Irish Indians, Luso-Indian, Macanese people, Scottish-Indian  

 Other mixed diaspora
 Chinese Indians
 Dougla
 Seychellois Creole people

 Indian-origin religions diaspora: 
 Buddhist diaspora: Tibetan diaspora
 Hindu diaspora: Bengali Hindu diaspora
 Jain diaspora
 Sikh diaspora

 Foreign-origin religions diaspora of overseas Indians
 Jews: Bnei Menashe Mizo-Manipuri diaspora

 Global influence of Indian diaspora organisations and lobby groups
 Global Organization for People of Indian Origin
 Indian origin politicians in other nations

See also

 
 
 
 
 
 

Cultural assimilation
Indian culture
Indosphere